Jonathan David Gómez Espinoza (born 21 December 1989) is an Argentine professional footballer who plays as an attacking midfielder for Racing Club, on loan from Argentinos Juniors.

Club career
Gómez emerged from the Rosario Central youth team to make his full debut for the club on 22 August 2008 aged 18 in a 0-1 home defeat to Colón de Santa Fe. He soon established himself as a regular first-team player and in 2009 he was allocated the coveted number 10 squad number. He scored his first goal for the club in a 1-1 home draw with Gimnasia y Esgrima de La Plata on 9 October 2009.

Santa Fe
In December 2015 he arrives to Independiente Santa Fe after signing a 3-year contract.

São Paulo
On 21 June 2017 Gómez signed with Brazilian side São Paulo a three-year deal.

CSA (loan)
In 6 June 2019 CSA signed Gómez, on loan from São Paulo, until December 2019.

Notes

References

External links
 
 
 Argentine Primera statistics at Futbol XXI  
 

1989 births
Living people
People from San Lorenzo Department
Argentine footballers
Argentine expatriate footballers
Association football midfielders
Rosario Central footballers
Arsenal de Sarandí footballers
Atlético Tucumán footballers
Deportivo Pasto footballers
Independiente Santa Fe footballers
Real Murcia players
São Paulo FC players
Al-Fayha FC players
Centro Sportivo Alagoano players
Sport Club do Recife players
Argentinos Juniors footballers
Racing Club de Avellaneda footballers
Argentine Primera División players
Segunda División players
Saudi Professional League players
Categoría Primera A players
Campeonato Brasileiro Série A players
Expatriate footballers in Spain
Expatriate footballers in Colombia
Expatriate footballers in Brazil
Expatriate footballers in Saudi Arabia
Argentine expatriate sportspeople in Spain
Argentine expatriate sportspeople in Colombia
Argentine expatriate sportspeople in Brazil
Argentine expatriate sportspeople in Saudi Arabia
Sportspeople from Santa Fe Province